Fahd Aodi (born January 1, 1982, in Homs, Syria) is a Syrian footballer. He currently plays for Al-Wathba in the Syrian League.

Club career
He played for Al-Karamah in the 2008 AFC Champions League group stages.

Honour and Titles

Club
Al-Karamah
Syrian Premier League (4 titles): 2006, 2007, 2008, 2009
Syrian Cup (4 titles): 2007, 2008, 2009, 2010
Syrian Super Cup (1 title): 2008
AFC Champions League: 2006 Runner-up
AFC Cup: 2009 Runner-up

National Team
West Asian Games 2005: Runner-up

References

1982 births
Living people
Sportspeople from Homs
Association football midfielders
Syrian footballers
Syria international footballers
Syrian expatriate footballers
Expatriate footballers in Lebanon
Syrian expatriate sportspeople in Lebanon
Al-Karamah players
Akhaa Ahli Aley FC players
Salam Zgharta FC players
Al Ansar FC players
Al-Wathba SC players
Lebanese Premier League players
Syrian Premier League players